Benjamin William Bova (November 8, 1932November 29, 2020) was an American writer and editor. During a writing career of 60 years, he was the author of more than 120 works of science fact and fiction, an editor of Analog Science Fiction and Fact, for which he won a Hugo Award six times, and an editorial director of Omni; he was also president of both the National Space Society and the Science Fiction Writers of America.

Personal life and education
Ben Bova was born on November 8, 1932, in Philadelphia. He graduated from South Philadelphia High School in 1949. In 1953, while attending Temple University in Philadelphia, he married Rosa Cucinotta; they had a son and a daughter. The couple divorced in 1974. That year he married Barbara Berson Rose. Barbara Bova died on September 23, 2009. Bova dedicated his 2011 novel Power Play to Barbara. In March 2013, he announced on his website that he had remarried, to Rashida Loya.

Bova was an atheist and was critical of what he saw as the unquestioning nature of religion. He wrote an op-ed piece in 2012, in which he argued that atheists can be just as moral as religious believers.

He went back to school in the 1980s, earning a Master of Arts degree in communications in 1987 from the State University of New York at Albany and a Doctor of Education degree from California Coast University in 1996.

Bova died from COVID-19-related pneumonia and a stroke on November 29, 2020, at the age of 88.

Career

Bova worked as a technical writer for Project Vanguard in the 1950s and later for the Avco Everett Research Laboratory 

In 1972, Bova became editor of Analog Science Fact & Fiction, after John W. Campbell's death in 1971. At Analog, Bova won six Hugo Awards for Best Professional Editor.

Bova served as the science advisor for the television series The Starlost (1973), resigning as he lacked the "contractual right to remove his name from the credits." His novel The Starcrossed, loosely based on his experiences, featured a characterization of his friend and colleague Harlan Ellison as "Ron Gabriel". In 1974, he co-wrote the screenplay for an episode of the children's science-fiction television series Land of the Lost, titled "The Search". After leaving Analog in 1978, Bova went on to edit Omni, from 1978 to 1982.

Bova held the position of President Emeritus of the National Space Society and served as President of Science Fiction and Fantasy Writers of America (SFWA).

In 2000, he attended the 58th World Science Fiction Convention (Chicon 2000) as the Author Guest of Honor. In 2007, Stuber/Parent Productions hired him as a consultant to provide insight into what the world may look like in the near future, for their film Repo Men (2010) starring Jude Law and Forest Whitaker. Also in 2007 he provided consulting services to Silver Pictures on the film adaptation of Richard K. Morgan's hardboiled cyberpunk science-fiction novel Altered Carbon (2002). He was awarded the Robert A. Heinlein Award in 2008 for his work in science fiction.

Bibliography
, Bova had written over 124 books in various genres. He edited several works, including The Science Fiction Hall of Fame, Volume Two (1973) and Nebula Awards Showcase 2008. He wrote the Grand Tour novel series about exploration and colonization of the Solar System by humans. Reviewing a collection of 12 of the series published in 2004, The New York Times described Bova as "the last of the great pulp writers".

References

External links

 
 
 
 
 
 
 
 
 Obituary  at Analog

1932 births
2020 deaths
20th-century American male writers
20th-century American non-fiction writers
20th-century American novelists
20th-century American short story writers
20th-century essayists
21st-century American male writers
21st-century American non-fiction writers
21st-century American novelists
21st-century American short story writers
21st-century essayists
American atheists
American male essayists
American male non-fiction writers
American male novelists
American male short story writers
American writers of Italian descent
American science fiction writers
American speculative fiction editors
Analog Science Fiction and Fact people
Anthologists
California Coast University alumni
Critics of religions
Deaths from the COVID-19 pandemic in Florida
Deaths from pneumonia in Florida
Hugo Award-winning editors
Inkpot Award winners
The Magazine of Fantasy & Science Fiction people
Novelists from Connecticut
Novelists from Pennsylvania
People from West Hartford, Connecticut
Science fiction critics
Science fiction editors
Technical writers
Temple University alumni
Writers about religion and science
Writers from Philadelphia
Writers of books about writing fiction